Risbecia nyalya is a species of colourful sea slug or dorid nudibranch, a marine gastropod mollusk in the family Chromodorididae.

Distribution
This nudibranch is found in the Caribbean.

Description
Risbecia nyalya has a blue or purple body with a white and orange-yellow lined mantle. The gills and rhinophores are purple or blue.

The maximum recorded length is 35 mm.

Habitat
Minimum recorded depth is 2 m. Maximum recorded depth is 7 m.

It feeds on sponges.

References

Further reading
 Ortea, J., Valdes, A. & Garcia-Gomez, J.C. (1996) Review of the Atlantic species of the Family Chromodorididae (Mollusca: Nudibranchia) of the blue chromatic group. Avicennia (Suppl. 1): 1-160.
 Rosenberg, G., F. Moretzsohn, and E. F. García. 2009. Gastropoda (Mollusca) of the Gulf of Mexico, Pp. 579–699 in Felder, D.L. and D.K. Camp (eds.), Gulf of Mexico–Origins, Waters, and Biota. Biodiversity. Texas A&M Press, College Station, Texas

Chromodorididae
Gastropods described in 1967